Olle Johansson may refer to
Olle Johansson (swimmer) (1927–1994), Swedish swimmer and water polo player
Olle Johansson (sailor) (born 1957), Swedish sailor
Kent-Olle Johansson (born 1960), Swedish wrestler